Choi Seung-ho (born 31 March 1992) is a South Korean footballer who plays as midfielder for FC Anyang in K League 2.

Career
He was selected by Chungju Hummel in 2014 K League draft. He made his professional debut in the league match against FC Anyang on 11 May 2014.

References

External links 

1992 births
Living people
Association football midfielders
South Korean footballers
Chungju Hummel FC players
FC Anyang players
K League 2 players